Sebastian Elbaum is an Argentinian-American computer scientist. During the COVID-19 pandemic, Elbaum was elected a Fellow of the Institute of Electrical and Electronics Engineers in "recognition of his contributions of testing techniques for evolving systems."

Early life and education
Elbaum received his Ph.D. from the University of Idaho and a Systems Engineering degree from Catholic University of Córdoba.

Career
Upon completing his education, Elbaum accepted a faculty position at the University of Nebraska–Lincoln where he co-founded two international recognized labs, the E2 Software Engineering Lab and the Nimbus Robotics Lab. He received a $36,500 Google Faculty Research Award and National Science Foundation Award for his project "Solving the Search for Code with Inputs and Outputs" for one year. The following year, he collaborated with Carrick Detweiler for their project "Co-Aerial Ecologist: Robotic Water Sampling and Sensing in the Wild" project as part of the National Robotics Initiative. In 2015, Elbaum was appointed to the rank of Willa Cather/Charles Bessey Professorship.

Elbaum eventually left the University of Nebraska–Lincoln in 2018 to accept a similar position at the University of Virginia. During the COVID-19 pandemic, Elbaum was elected a Fellow of the Institute of Electrical and Electronics Engineers in "recognition of his contributions of testing techniques for evolving systems." He was named to the 2022 class of ACM Fellows, "for contributions to the analysis and testing of evolving systems and robotic systems".

References

External links

American computer scientists
Fellow Members of the IEEE
Fellows of the Association for Computing Machinery
University of Idaho alumni
University of Virginia faculty
University of Nebraska–Lincoln faculty
Living people
Year of birth missing (living people)